The Puhl House, also known as the Bacon House, is a historic house at the corner of Scott Road and Glenn Highway in Palmer, Alaska. The diameter and length of the logs reduces as they rise to the eaves; oakum chinking is used to close the gaps. The house was built in 1935 by Joe and Blanche Puhl, settlers who were part of the Matanuska Valley Colony settlement project. This building is distinctive as a colony house because it was not built by the crews of the Works Progress Administration that built most of the colony's housing; the Puhls organized their own construction team and acquired materials for its construction on their own.

The house was listed on the National Register of Historic Places in 1991.

See also
National Register of Historic Places listings in Matanuska-Susitna Borough, Alaska

References

Houses on the National Register of Historic Places in Alaska
Houses completed in 1935
Houses in Matanuska-Susitna Borough, Alaska
Buildings and structures on the National Register of Historic Places in Matanuska-Susitna Borough, Alaska